Bunium luristanicum is a species of flowering plant in the family Apiaceae described by Karl Heinz Rechinger. Bunium luristanicum is placed in the family Apiaceae. For this species, no subspecies are listed in the Catalogue of Life. It is found in western and southwestern Iran.

References

Apioideae
Flora of Central Asia
Flora of Western Asia
Spices